Gabriela Gozani (born ) was a Brazilian female water polo player. She was part of the Brazil women's national water polo team.

She competed at the 2011 World Aquatics Championships. and won a bronze medal at the 2011 Pan American Games.

References

External links

1991 births
Living people
Brazilian female water polo players
Place of birth missing (living people)
Water polo players at the 2011 Pan American Games
Pan American Games water polo players of Brazil
Pan American Games medalists in water polo
Pan American Games bronze medalists for Brazil
Medalists at the 2011 Pan American Games
21st-century Brazilian women